Paris au Printemps is a live album recorded by Public Image Ltd (given as 'Image Publique S.A.' on the cover) in 1980 on two consecutive dates in January in Paris, and released in November the same year. The title of the album is French for 'Paris in the Spring', with French names also given to the band itself and songs in the track listing. It is notable as the band's last full-length release featuring founding bass player Jah Wobble, as well as the Paris concerts being drummer Martin Atkins' first gigs with Public Image Ltd. The album reached number 61 on the UK album charts.

Recording
John Lydon has stressed that the album was made and submitted to Virgin Records to cover the band's expenses for the Metal Box album. During a BBC radio interview in 1992 he said: 

It has additionally been described as countering an abundance of "unlistenable" bootlegs of the band's live performances being released at the time.
Lydon has elaborated that the album cost the band "exactly the price of one reel-to-reel tape to record", which they did on a Revox recorder, consequently receiving £30,000 from Virgin Records for it. The same amount has been mentioned as the sum the band had previously invested into the release of the Metal Box album.

Packaging
The front cover painting is by John Lydon and represents himself, Keith Levene and Jeannette Lee.

Track listing

Side one
"Thème" ("Theme")
"Psalmodie" ("Chant")
"Précipitamment" ("Careering")

Side two
"Sale Bébé" ("Bad Baby")
"La Vie Ignoble" ("Low Life")
"Attaque" ("Attack")
"Timbres De Pop" ("Poptones")

Personnel
Public Image Limited
John Lydon – vocals, sleeve paintings
Keith Levene – guitar, synthesiser
Jah Wobble – bass
Martin Atkins – drums

Charts

UK
“Paris Au Printemps” briefly entered the UK Albums Chart, where it stayed for 2 weeks and reached #61 on 22 November 1980.

Other countries
In the USA, the album was not released.
In New Zealand, “Paris Au Printemps” briefly entered the Top 50 Albums Chart, where it stayed for 2 weeks and reached #48 on 1 March 1981.

References 

Public Image Ltd albums
1980 live albums
Virgin Records live albums